Sir... I Love You is a 1991 Indian Tamil-language film directed by G. N. Rangarajan. The film stars Sivakumar and Ranjini. It was released on 21 June 1991. This was Ranjini's final Tamil film.<ref>{{Cite web |date=5 November 2019 |title=என் கார் மேல கல் எறிஞ்சாங்க... அதிர்ச்சியாவும் சிரிப்பாவும் இருந்துச்சு!" - நடிகை ரஞ்சனி ஷேரிங்ஸ் |url=https://cinema.vikatan.com/tamil-cinema/actress-ranjani-shares-her-old-memories |url-status=live |archive-url=https://web.archive.org/web/20220430081849/https://cinema.vikatan.com/tamil-cinema/actress-ranjani-shares-her-old-memories |archive-date=30 April 2022 |access-date=30 April 2022 |website=Ananda Vikatan |language=ta}}</ref>

 Plot 

 Cast 
Sivakumar as Arun
Ranjini as Lalitha
Jaishankar as Lalitha's father
Lakshmi as Veni, Lalitha's mother
S. S. Chandran
T. S. Raghavendra
Charuhasan as Namasivayam
Loose Mohan
Soorya
Varalakshmi as Arun's mother
Jegan as Jegan

 Soundtrack 
The music was composed by Ilaiyaraaja, with lyrics written by Na. Kamarasan and Kuruvikkarambai Shanmugam.

 Reception 
Sundarji of Kalki'' called Sivakumar's character a "readymade" role, noting that despite so many minor flaws, the film was barely able to escape them by a hairline.

References

External links 
 

1990s Tamil-language films
1991 films
Films directed by G. N. Rangarajan
Films scored by Ilaiyaraaja